Windgate Press is a small American publisher located in Sausalito, California whose focus is on San Francisco and California photographic history.

See also
List of publishers

External links
Windgate Press - publisher's website

Book publishing companies based in the San Francisco Bay Area
Companies based in Marin County, California